Worood Zuhair (born 2000) is an Iraqi women's rights activist, biologist, and author who lives in Germany.

Early life and education
Zuhair was born in Najaf. In 2010, she graduated with a bachelor's degree in biology from the University of Karbala in Biology. She relates that before graduating, she was a victim of domestic violence, when her father and her brother attacked her, causing her to lose consciousness and breaking her spine, because she left the house without permission and discussed her atheism.

Activism in Germany
Zuhair migrated to Germany in 2016 after successfully arguing that the danger she faced from her family made her a candidate for refugee status; after arriving, she received death threats over her secular blog posts, and is under police protection.

After arriving in Germany, she started campaigns to demand the rights for women in the Middle East, organized and participated in protests for the cause and spoken with international media organizations and on social media in support of the campaigns for freedom and gender equality.

She has had many media interviews, given speeches and participated in international conferences, including the Richard Dawkins Foundation, where she discussed her personal life and advocated for greater freedom of speech and expression for Iraqis.

Books

Zuhair announced her first book by the name of Naked Revolution to be published soon in Arabic and later in English, She called the book "out of ordinary", she announced it after her Naked Revolution campaign that she started demands women freedom from the intellectual closed state of mind and liberates from body restrictions.

See also
Hanaa Edwar
Rana Ahmad
Rahaf Mohammed
Tara Fares

References

Sources

External links 

1987 births
20th-century Iraqi women
21st-century Iraqi women
Atheist feminists
Former Muslim critics of Islam
Former Muslims turned agnostics or atheists
Iraqi atheists
Iraqi feminists
Iraqi refugees
Iraqi torture victims
Iraqi women's rights activists
Living people
Refugees in Germany
Victims of human rights abuses
Violence against women in Iraq
Iraqi women bloggers
Women human rights activists